La Luz Fútbol Club (often called La Luz) is a football club from Montevideo in Uruguay. Currently playing in the uruguayan Primera División.

History
It all started in and around Faustino Fernández's bar, located in the village "Aires Puros", it was one of the few buildings that had electricity by 1929 in that zone. A group of "football lovers" were always at the bar, where they shared their dreams. Among them, there were Luis Rivero, Luis Enrico, and José Ruecco. By April 1929, they founded La Luz Fútbol Club, adopting white jerseys. La Luz meaning the "Light" of the bar, where the used to hang out and dreamed about having their own club to be able to play in a league. In 2011, after returning to the national football scenario, Resolve hire foreign players to strengthen the team with the arrival of Carlos Augusto Aguiar and Fabricio Melillo, the team creates expectations in the crowd.

Titles
Uruguayan Segunda División Amateur: 1962, 1976, 1992, 2001, 2003.
Liga Uruguaya de Football Amateur - Divisional Extra: 1933

References

External links

 
Football clubs in Uruguay
Association football clubs established in 1929
Sport in Montevideo
1929 establishments in Uruguay